Francesco Montella (born April 23, 1987 in Naples, Italy) is an Italian footballer who plays as defender for Italian Lega Pro Seconda Divisione team Brindisi.

External links
Profile at aic.football.it 

Italian footballers
U.S. Catanzaro 1929 players
A.S. Roma players
1987 births
Living people
S.S.D. Città di Brindisi players
Association football defenders